Mary Catherine of St. Augustine, OSA, (3 May 1632 – 8 May 1668) was a French canoness regular who was instrumental in the development of the Hôtel-Dieu de Québec in service to the colony of New France. She has been beatified by the Catholic Church.

Early life
She was born Catherine de Simon de Longpré in the town of Saint-Sauveur-le-Vicomte, then part of the ancient Province of Normandy in France. Raised primarily by her grandparents, as a child she showed a marked concern for the needs of the sick and the poor. In 1644 she entered the monastery of the Canonesses of St. Augustine of the Mercy of Jesus in Bayeux, which operated the Hôtel-Dieu of the city. She was received into the novitiate of the Order on 24 October of that year, at which point she was given the religious name by which she is now known.

New France
In the year 1648 she was among those of the Order who responded to the appeal to help the canonesses in Quebec who had founded the Hôtel-Dieu there for the needs of the colony. On 31 May, then aged 16, Catherine set sail for the colony. While en route, she fell victim to the plague, from which she was cured in what seemed a miraculous way, which she attributed to the protection of the Blessed Mother, through the means of a statue of her which she had brought with her from France and which is still revered as miraculous. She arrived in the port of Quebec on 19 August.

After Catherine's arrival, she began the task of nursing the sick in the hospital of the monastery, attending to both their spiritual and physical needs. She learned the languages of the First Peoples of the region to serve them better. She would work to bring the patients closer to God. The superior of the hospital later testified that she and the other canonesses could tell that Catherine would spend long periods in prayer and undertook severe mortifications of her body in support of her spiritual mission, to the point of endangering her own health.

At the same time as she also cared for the patients in these different ways, Catherine spent nine years as treasurer of the hospital. Additionally, she was entrusted with the task of forming new candidates to the community as Novice Mistress. Yet, despite this harsh way of life, both her superior and the famed Ursuline of Quebec, Marie of the Incarnation, attested to the sweetness of disposition Catherine continually exhibited in dealing with others throughout her life, and for which she was known throughout the colony.

Catherine of St. Augustine died in 1668 at the hospital she had helped to run, aged 36. She was widely held by the people of New France to have been a saint.

Veneration
Due to her self-sacrifice for both the European settlers of the colony and for the native inhabitants, Catherine came to be honoured as one of the six founders of the Catholic Church in Canada, representing the contributions of the Augustinian canonesses. The cause for her canonization was presented to the Holy See in Vatican City.

Catherine was declared to have lived a life of extraordinary virtue on 9 March 1984 by Pope John Paul II. Declaring that she offered her life for the establishment of the Catholic faith in Canada, this same pope, on 23 April 1989, beatified her.

Catherine's feast day is celebrated in Quebec on 8 May. Her remains are preserved for veneration at the Centre Catherine-de-Saint-Augustin, adjacent to the Hôtel-Dieu.

References

1632 births
1668 deaths
People from Manche
17th-century French people
Augustinian canonesses
French nurses
French women nurses
People of New France
Canadian nurses
Canadian women nurses
Burials in Quebec
French beatified people
Canadian beatified people
Beatifications by Pope John Paul II
Venerated Catholics by Pope John Paul II